Chashmasor (formerly Utkansoy) is a jamoat in north-west Tajikistan. It is located in Ghafurov District in Sughd Region. The jamoat has a total population of 10,275 (2015). It consists of 28 villages, including Mirzorabot (the seat) and Kuhsor.

References

Populated places in Sughd Region
Jamoats of Tajikistan